Ellwood Christian Academy is a private, coeducational PK-12 Christian school in Selma, Alabama. It serves 269 students.

About half of the enrollment, all black in 2016, take advantage of a $7500 Alabama tax credit to attend the school.

History
The Ellwood Community Church took over Central Christian Academy in 2010, changing its name to Ellwood.

References 

Christian schools in Alabama
Private K-12 schools in Alabama
Educational institutions established in 1965
Education in Selma, Alabama
1965 establishments in Alabama